The 1989 Mobil Cotton Bowl Classic was a college football bowl game played on January 2, 1989, at the Cotton Bowl in Dallas. The game was played on January 2, the day after New Year's Day, since New Year's Day fell on a Sunday. The bowl game featured the Arkansas Razorbacks from the Southwest Conference and the UCLA Bruins from the Pacific-10 Conference and was televised in the United States on CBS. UCLA defeated Arkansas 17-3 for its first Cotton Bowl win. Troy Aikman, the UCLA quarterback and LaSalle Harper, an Arkansas linebacker were named the Most Valuable Players of the game.

Game invitation

Arkansas Razorbacks
The 1988 Arkansas Razorbacks football team was undefeated through Southwest Conference play. In the final regular season game, the #3 Miami Hurricanes defeated the Razorbacks, 18-16. Arkansas was invited to the Cotton Bowl Classic as the winner of the Southwest Conference. Arkansas played in its first Cotton Bowl Classic since the 1976 Cotton Bowl Classic.

UCLA Bruins
Going into the UCLA–USC rivalry game, UCLA was 9-1 and had been ranked #1 for a couple of weeks earlier. Eric Ball
, the 1986 Rose Bowl MVP had a crucial fumble in the UCLA vs Washington State game, when the #1 ranked Bruins were upset at home by the Cougars 34-30.  The game was one of the notable ones in the UCLA–USC rivalry in that it was for the Pac-10 championship, a possible Heisman Trophy for either Troy Aikman of UCLA or Rodney Peete of USC. It was also for the Rose Bowl berth. Rodney Peete was found to have measles in the days before the game. USC used a strong ground game and "bend but don't break" defense, in front of the largest Rose Bowl Stadium regular season crowd in history, to beat the Bruins 31-22. The Cotton Bowl Classic agreed to take the team that would not be going to the 1989 Rose Bowl. UCLA was the first Pac-10 team to play in the Cotton Bowl Classic and first from the West Coast since the 1949 Cotton Bowl Classic where the University of Oregon played SMU.

Pre-game buildup
The 1989 game between UCLA and Arkansas was highly publicized in the Dallas area because UCLA quarterback Troy Aikman was expected to be the #1 pick in the NFL draft by the Dallas Cowboys.   Much was made of Cowboys coach Tom Landry watching Aikman practice at Texas Stadium (UCLA's practice facility for game preparation). Head coach Ken Hatfield suspended All-American defensive end Wayne Martin and All-American offensive guard Freddie Childress days before the game, for an undisclosed violation of team rules. This severely hampered Arkansas' play on both sides of the line of scrimmage.

Game summary

First quarter
No Score

Second quarter
UCLA — Mark Estwick, one-yard run. Alfredo Velasco converts. 
UCLA — Corwin Anthony, one-yard pass from Troy Aikman. Velasco converts.

Third quarter
Arkansas — Kendall Trainor, 49-yard field goal.

Fourth quarter
UCLA — Alfredo Velasco, 32-yard field goal.

Notes
 UCLA won its 7th consecutive bowl game, setting a new NCAA record.

Aftermath
UCLA Bruins quarterback Troy Aikman completed 19 of 27 passes for 172 yards, and Bruin teammate Shawn Wills rushed for 120 yards. UCLA held Arkansas to four first downs and 42 yards, the lowest yardage total in Arkansas school history.
UCLA finished number 6 in the final AP poll, and Arkansas was ranked 12.

Tom Landry never got to draft Aikman, because he was fired the next month, but his successor, Jimmy Johnson, did draft Aikman. Aikman would go on to lead the Dallas Cowboys to three Super Bowl titles in the 1990s in his Hall of Fame career.

Arkansas' Wayne Martin and Steve Atwater were also first round draft selections in the 1989 NFL Draft. Martin played twelve years for the New Orleans Saints, and Atwater won two Super Bowls of his own with the Denver Broncos and was elected to the Pro Football Hall of Fame in 2020.

References

Bibliography

UCLA Bruins football media guide (PDF copy available at www.uclabruins.com)

Cotton Bowl Classic
Cotton Bowl Classic
Arkansas Razorbacks football bowl games
UCLA Bruins football bowl games
Cotton Bowl Classic
January 1989 sports events in the United States